The McCarricks are the husband and wife band of Martin McCarrick on cello and Kimberlee McCarrick on violin. they have collaborated widely, including Kristin Hersh, Sinéad O'Connor, Gary Numan, Marianne Faithfull and Patti Smith's Meltdown concerts at the Royal Festival Hall in London.
Their solo performances are in front of silent films produced specially for their performances.

Discography

The McCarricks 
The McCarricks 2007 - "3"

Collaborations
Learn to Sing Like a Star - Kristin Hersh - 2007

External links
 Official website
 Interview in the Londonist

Married couples
British musical duos